Donald Angus Cameron of Lochiel, DL, JP (born 2 August 1946) is the 27th and present Lochiel of Clan Cameron. He served as honorary Lord Lieutenant of Inverness from 2002 to 2021.

Early life 
Cameron was born in Kensington, London, the eldest son of four children born to Sir Donald Cameron, 26th Lochiel and Lady Margot (née Gathorne-Hardy), only daughter of Hon. Nigel Gathorne-Hardy and Doris Featherston Johnston, of Wellington, New Zealand.

Cameron was educated at Harrow School and he went on to read history at Christ Church, Oxford (MA, FCA).

Career and chiefship 
In 1966 he was commissioned as a Lieutenant in the Queen's Own Cameron Highlanders (TA). He left the army in 1968 and trained as a chartered accountant.

Upon the death of his father in 2004, he assumed the chiefship of Clan Cameron and became the 27th Lochiel. Between 1994 and 1996, he served as president, Highland society of London, a Highland-based charity.

In 1986 he was appointed a Deputy lieutenant and served as Lord Lieutenant of Inverness from 2002 until retiring in 2021.

Naruhito 
In 1983 Prince Naruhito (present Emperor of Japan), an avid hiker and mountaineer studying at Oxford, stayed at Achnacarry Castle during an expedition to climb Ben Nevis, Lochaber. Cameron hosted Naruhito and the pair became friends.

A portrait of Naruhito is presently kept at Achnacarry.

Personal life 
Cameron is disabled, suffering from Multiple sclerosis.

On 1 June 1974, he married Lady Cecil Kerr OBE, a courtier and daughter of Peter Kerr, 12th Marquess of Lothian by his wife Antonella Reuss Newland. Cameron and Lady Cecil had four children:

 Catherine Mary Cameron (born 1 March 1975), a goddaughter of King Charles III and was a bridesmaid to Princess Diana; married Henry Trotter of Mortonhall
 Donald Andrew John Cameron, Master of Lochiel (born 26 November 1976), MSP
 Lucy Margot Cameron (born 5 July 1980), has Anne, Princess Royal as one of her godmothers
 Emily Frances Cameron (born 18 January 1986)

References 

Living people
1946 births
Clan Cameron